A special election was held in  on November 3, 1826 to fill a vacancy caused by the resignation of Willie P. Mangum (J) on March 18, 1826

Election results

Barringer took his seat December 4, 1826

See also
List of special elections to the United States House of Representatives

References

North Carolina 1826 08
North Carolina 1826 08
1826 08
North Carolina 08
United States House of Representatives 08
United States House of Representatives 1826 08
November 1826 events